Shivered is a Persian heavy metal band formed in 2015 by Mohammad Maki. Shivered is composed of front-man Mohammad Maki and Session musicians, such as Doug Ross and Arnaud Krakowka. The band has been labeled as Gothic, Progressive, and Doom Metal with hints of Rock. The band signed to independent label SenseSpirit in 2015.

Biography

Debut EP and The beginning of the band (2015–2016) 
Shivered was formed in 2015 by multi-instrumentalist Mohammad Maki. Previously before founding Shivered Mohammad Maki had worked on Alternative Metal band Lorn which got disbanded in 2015 due to legal issues with the band's name. In early 2015 Mohammad Maki started working on the band's debut EP " Bereaved and Gone Insane " which got released with the help of session musicians Doug Ross on the bass and Arnaud Krawokwa on Drums in May 20th of 2016,  the record was mixed and mastered by JARO SOUND

Journey to Fade and the future of the band (2017–2018) 
Shortly after releasing the debut EP, Mohammad Maki started working on the band debut full LP " Journey to Fade " with more direct connection with session musicians which helped the band get more progressive sound to it unlike the previous EP. the record was mixed and mastered by Derek Moffat from 608 Studios

The band released Journey to Fade on May 20, 2017.

By the end of 2017 Mohammad Maki on official Shivered Facebook page announced the band will go under a small hiatus due to financial issues but also said the band will release a single song in early 2018, " Disfigured Heart " released on February 20, 2018

Discography 
Studio albums
 Journey to Fade (2017)
EPs
 Bereaved and Gone Insane (2016)
Singles
 Disfigured Heart (2018)

Lyrical themes 
Many of the band's lyrics use various aspects of psychology, death, Love, suicide and pessimism, In the band debut EP " Bereaved and Gone Insane " lyrics were more Gothic and dark such as the song " Doomsday Sun " which is about gothic love but in their debut LP " Journey to Fade " their lyrics expanded to more Psychological and pessimistic, such as the songs " Neurotic " and " The Light Tears Apart "

Band members 
 Mohammad Maki – Vocals, Guitar
 Doug Ross – Bass
 Arnaud Krakowka – Drums

External links 

Shivered on Facebook

References 
 Shivered artist page on allmusic
 Journey to fade album review by wingsofdeath.net https://www.wingsofdeath.net/Shivered-Journey-to-Fade
 bleeding4metal review of Journey to fade http://bleeding4metal.de/index.php?show=review_de&id=8748
Musical groups established in 2015
Iranian heavy metal musical groups
2015 establishments in Iran